FT3 or ft3 may refer to: 
 Cubic foot (ft3)
 Finlayson Lake Airport
 Free Triiodothyronine
 Socket FT3